Shaheizy Sam bin Abdul Samad (born 4 September 1982) is a Malaysian actor, singer, and producer who was known as a young star in the 1990s before rising to fame in the film Bohsia: Jangan Pilih Jalan Hitam in 2009, and Adnan Sempit in the following year.

Biography

Family
Three of his siblings are also involved in the entertainment industry. His first brother, Ahmad Shah Al-Jeffry (also known as Jeff), was a member of a 1990s pop group, A to Z. His sister, Zizie Ezette, is an actress with numerous film and TV dramas to her credit.

Personal life
Shaheizy Sam married Malaysian actress Syatilla Melvin on 8 February 2016. The couple has a son born in 2017.

Filmography

Film

Telemovie

Television series

Television show

Web series

Endorsements

Discography
 Oh! Saya Sayangkan Mamee
 Begini Caranya Feat Yana Samsudin 
 Bangun Feat Liyana Jasmay 
 Go ! Go ! Go ! Feat Aniu (ost Rembat)

Activism
On 21 May 2015, Sam was appointed alongside comedian Nabil Ahmad as the 1JPJ Youth Squad Icons by the Road Transport Department of Malaysia (JPJ). The purpose of 1JPJ Youth Squad is to provide public awareness of road safety and foster a spirit of volunteerism, unity and patriotism.

Awards and nominations

References

External links

 
 
 
 

1983 births
Living people
Malaysian Muslims
Malaysian people of Malay descent
People from Kuala Lumpur
21st-century Malaysian male actors
Malaysian male actors
Malaysian male film actors
Malaysian male television actors
21st-century Malaysian male singers
Malay-language singers